The 1984 Cork Senior Hurling Championship was the 96th staging of the Cork Senior Hurling Championship since its establishment by the Cork County Board in 1887. The championship began on 4 May 1984 and ended on 30 September 1984.

Midleton entered the championship as the defending champions, however, they were beaten by St. Finbarr's in the quarter-finals. University College Cork fielded a team after a two-year absence.

The final was played on 30 September 1984 at Páirc Uí Chaoimh in Cork, between St. Finbarr's and Ballyhea, in what was their first ever meeting in the final. St. Finbarr's won the match by 1–15 to 2–04 to claim their 23rd championship title overall and a first title in two years.

Denis Walsh was the championship's top scorer with 0-31.

Results

First round

Second round

Quarter-finals

Semi-finals

Final

Championship statistics

Top scorers

Top scorers overall

Top scorers in a single game

References

Cork Senior Hurling Championship
Cork Senior Hurling Championship